Nonhyeon-dong is a ward of Gangnam-gu in Seoul, South Korea. It borders Apgujeong and Sinsa-dong on the north, Samseong-dong on the northeast, and Yeoksam-dong to the south.

Education
Schools located in Nonhyeon-dong:
 Seoul Hakdong Elementary School
 Seoul Nonhyeon Elementary School
 Eonbuk Middle School

See also 
Dong of Gangnam-gu
Administrative divisions of South Korea

References

External links
 Nonhyeon 1-dong resident center site
Gangnam-gu map

Neighbourhoods in Gangnam District